is an upcoming fighting game co-developed by Bandai Namco Studios and Arika and published by Bandai Namco Entertainment. The eighth main and tenth overall installment in the Tekken series, the game is set to be released for PlayStation 5, Windows, and Xbox Series X and Series S.

Gameplay
According to director Katsuhiro Harada, Tekken 8 gameplay will focus on "aggressiveness" and will have a new "Heat" gauge system, in addition to returning gameplay features from Tekken 7, such as Rage system-based attacks, with the Rage Drive having been separated and reworked as a Heat system-based move known as Heat Smash, leaving the Rage State that can only have an access to use Rage Art once more like prior to the Fated Retribution version of Tekken 7. The gameplay will reward aggressiveness rather than those who "turtle up". Similar to Soul Charge state from Soulcalibur VI, the Heat State grants not only chip damage, but also changes the properties of some characters’ move sets, such as a heavy guard break. Fighters can also dash cancel their designate moves into the Heat State, similar to MAX Mode from The King of Fighters series. The Heat State’s timer can be stopped if fighters’ move sets are being used.

There will also be a focus on stage destruction, character reactions to these, and making the gameplay enjoyable to watch as well as play, since Tekken is now considered a high-level e-sports game. This new system was based on reception to the predecessor. Tekken 7’s “Screw” damage property was originally going to return in this game, but it is ultimately replaced with a newer juggle combo extender system that puts opponent into a ground-bound-like state upon falling to the ground quickly - similar to Tekken 6 - whether the combo extender be a launcher or a knockback. When guarding against a normal state’s heavy attack, or Heat State characters, fighters will receive a chip damage that causes their health bar to become regenerable. However, unlike the Tag mode-only health bar regeneration system from Tekken Tag Tournament games, fighters’ recoverable health can only be recovered via guarding against normal state characters, or attacks.

Rather than recycling content, all character models are completely new and are meant to be an improvement over previous games. In addition, voice lines will be based solely on the current voice actors, rather than using any from the previous games. In contrast to Tekken 7, which is powered by Unreal Engine 4, Tekken 8 will be powered by the Unreal Engine 5, making it the very first major fighting game to utilize this latest game engine.

Characters 

There are currently 11 confirmed characters (including palette swaps, or Heat State exclusive form) announced for the game. New characters are highlighted in bold.

Premise
Jin Kazama and his father, Kazuya Mishima, are poised to begin their final battle, which has been building up for several years. While Jin already faced his relatives in previous games from the franchise, in the upcoming one, he is shown in a major conflict with his Devil Gene abnormality. It continues absorbing his humanity to the point that he becomes his Devil Jin alter-ego in the middle of the fight. However, Harada has remarked that the final scene of the trailer involving broken chains acts as symbolism for Jin breaking free from the conflicts he has been connected with for several games. Set six months after the events of Tekken 7, the fight is reminiscent of the final battle between Kazuya and his father Heihachi, but Harada aims to surprise the audience. Jin wants to kill Kazuya to end the chaos from their lineage as his father keeps causing chaos in the world. The game marks the return of Jun Kazama, Jin's mother, who was believed to be dead in the events of Tekken 3 and onwards. Jun's design comes from artist Mari Shimazaki, famous for Bayonetta. The second trailer also revealed the return of Paul Phoenix, Marshall Law, King, Lars Alexandersson, as well as a new form of Jack.

Development
Tekken 8 was announced on September 13, 2022, via the PlayStation State of Play. A teaser for a new mainline entry in the series was shown during Tekken 7's tournament at EVO 2022, before being formally announced on September 13, 2022, during Sony's State of Play presentation. It is set for release on the PlayStation 5, Windows through Steam, and Xbox Series X/S platforms. As a continuation from the seventh mainline game, it will focus on a conclusion of Kazuya and Jin's enmity. It was announced after Tekken World Cup 2022 finals that Arika will be handling the game’s continued development aside rollback netcode, including for the recent patch of Tekken 7.

References

External links
 

Bandai Namco games
Namco games
Tekken games
Unreal Engine games
Upcoming video games
PlayStation 5 games
Video game sequels
Video games developed in Japan
Xbox Series X and Series S games
Windows games
Multiplayer and single-player video games
Upcoming video games scheduled for 2024